Teasc is a commune in Dolj County, Oltenia, Romania with a population of 3,360 people. It is composed of two villages, Secui and Teasc.

References

Communes in Dolj County
Localities in Oltenia